Out of the Closet is a nonprofit chain of thrift stores whose revenues provide medical care for patients with HIV/AIDS. The chain is owned and operated by the AIDS Healthcare Foundation (AHF), a Los Angeles-based charity that provides medical, preventive, and educational resources for patients. AHF is the nation's largest non-profit HIV/AIDS healthcare, research, prevention, and education provider. Out of the Closet thrift stores generate income to help fund the medical services AHF provides for those patients who are unable to pay. Proceeds from Out of the Closet Thrift Stores directly benefit AHF.


Background

Out of the Closet was founded by AHF president and co-founder Michael Weinstein, whose retail experience stemmed from his family's furniture business on the East Coast. He opened the first location in Atwater Village in 1990. The 'Out of the Closet' name has been federally trademarked by AHF since 1997.
There are now over 20 Out of the Closet locations throughout the United States, including four locations in the San Francisco Bay Area, three in Texas, five locations in Florida (including Orlando, St Petersburg and Miami), one in Ohio (in Columbus), and a location in New York City. A location opened in Capitol Hill, Seattle, in 2014.

In addition to regular thrift store operations, several stores also offer additional services, including free rapid STD and HIV testing on a walk-in basis, along with counseling in a separate location of the store.

References

External links

 AIDS Healthcare Foundation

1990 establishments in California
Atwater Village, Los Angeles
HIV/AIDS organizations in the United States
Non-profit organizations based in Los Angeles
Organizations established in 1990
Retail companies based in California
Retail companies established in 1990